Mega Man Zero 4 is a video game developed by Inti Creates and Natsume and published in 2005 by Capcom for the Game Boy Advance (GBA) handheld. It is the fourth and final installment of the Mega Man Zero subseries of the Mega Man franchise and is set several months after the events of Mega Man Zero 3. The European version featured a completely different logo, which was also used on Mega Man X7, Mega Man X8, Mega Man X: Command Mission, Mega Man Zero 2, Mega Man Zero 3, Mega Man Network Transmission, Mega Man Battle Chip Challenge, Mega Man Battle Network 3, Mega Man Battle Network 4, and Mega Man Battle Network 5. The game deals with Dr. Weil's reign over Neo Arcadia in which humans, who have been reduced to second-rate citizens, begin to escape in large numbers to the last-known livable location on the planet, Area Zero, beginning a conflict between the two groups. The effects of this war eventually drive Zero and the Resistance to protect Area Zero and its inhabitants from Dr. Weil.

Since its original release, it has been brought to the Nintendo DS family of systems as part of the Mega Man Zero Collection in 2010 and the Wii U's Virtual Console in 2016.  In February 2020, it was released on PC (Steam), Nintendo Switch, PlayStation 4, and Xbox One as part of the Mega Man Zero/ZX Legacy Collection.

Plot 
Several months after the destruction of Omega, Dr. Weil has assumed a dictatorial reign over Neo Arcadia, forcing many humans to flee. In response, Dr. Weil labels the escapees as Mavericks and begins to purge them as if they were Reploids.

A fleeing caravan led by a human journalist, Neige, is attacked by Dr. Weil's army. Zero, Ciel and a small band of Resistance fighters happen upon them and come to their aid. Neige explains they were en route to Area Zero, the crash site of the space colony Eurasia and one of the last natural habitats on Earth that can support human life. Shortly after parting ways, Zero learns of a plot called "Operation Ragnarok", meant to destroy all environments outside of Neo Arcadia in order to force humans to return and live under Dr. Weil's rule. Helping Dr. Weil on his quest are a group of violent Reploids called the Eight Einherjar Warriors. They are led by a military Reploid named Craft, who has a romantic history with Neige, thus creating conflicting thoughts within him.

After defeating four of the Einherjar Warriors, Area Zero comes under attack by Neo Arcadia. Zero defends it and is forced to battle Craft. Neige breaks up the fight, but she is kidnapped by Craft, who escapes. Zero chases him to a prison where Neige is held and eventually rescues her.

Later, Zero eliminates the remaining Einherjar Warriors, but Ciel intercepts a radio message from Dr. Weil. He announces he is going to use Ragnarok, an orbiting satellite weapon, to wipe out Area Zero.
Before Dr. Weil can use it, Craft turns on him and fires Ragnarok at Neo Arcadia in an attempt to kill Dr. Weil, which leaves the city in ruins. Zero, deeming Craft to be too dangerous, defeats him, and Craft succumbs to his wounds.

Ragnarok moves on a crash course for Area Zero, and Zero makes his way there to find that Dr. Weil somehow survived the destruction of Neo Arcadia.  Dr. Weil reveals that while he is human, he was made into a bionic-reploid hybrid by the people who exiled Omega and himself into space at the end of the Elf Wars. His new body is incapable of aging or dying, as it constantly repairs itself. Believing he can survive the impact of the crash and personally oversee the destruction of Area Zero, Dr. Weil fuses himself with the Ragnarok core and attacks Zero. After an intense battle and the destruction of Dr. Weil's body, Ragnarok breaks apart, but leaves Zero no means of escape.

Ciel runs through Area Zero where she learns that Zero did not teleport back. 
Heartbroken and distraught, Ciel runs off and ends up on top of a hill, where she breaks down in tears while pieces of Ragnarok burn through the atmosphere. Afterwards, she stands up and expresses her faith in Zero, hoping that he'll return someday while promising to carry on his mission of maintaining peace between humans and Reploids. The final scene shows Zero's shattered helmet somewhere in the desert.

Gameplay 
The fourth installment of the Mega Man Zero series introduces gameplay changes, but does not deviate from the platforming of its predecessors. Players guide Zero through eight main selectable stages, which are usually separated into two parts by a mini-boss battle. At the end of each level, the player faces one of the game's reploid antagonists.

Mega Man Zero 4 includes a new Easy Mode, not found in its prequels, in response to criticisms that the Mega Man Zero series had become too challenging. In Easy Mode, Zero receives a large life boost and can use the Cyber Elf without restrictions. However, Easy Mode prevents the changing of the weather, and consequentially the acquiring of EX Skills.

Zero is still equipped with the Buster Shot and Z-Saber at default. However, in place of the Shield Boomerang and the rod-type weapon from the previous games (i.e.: Triple Rod, Chain Rod and Recoil Rod) is the new Z-Knuckle. This device allows Zero to perform several actions, including hanging from pipes, destroying obstacles, stealing an enemy's weapon (if Zero destroys it using the Z-Knuckle) and acquiring special weapons in certain parts of a stage.

Another new element is the weather system, which allows players to choose between two weather conditions for each of the eight main stages. The difficulty of the stage varies depending on the chosen weather condition, with the stage being harder if the weather icon has an orange border around it. Sometimes, there are secret passages in some stages which the player can only reach by setting the weather to "hard". The trade-off for an easier level is that Zero cannot learn an EX Skill from a boss.

Cyber Elves, a core element of previous Mega Man Zero installments, are small helpers who can assist Zero in combat. Shortly after the introductory levels, a Cyber Elf will arrive for Zero to equip. This elf has most of the powers of Cyber Elves from previous games, which are unlocked as the player raises its level by feeding it E-Crystals. Zero may select one power from each of three categories: Nurse, Animal, and Hacker. The player's ranking at the end of a level is no longer given a penalty for using the Cyber Elves as long as they are kept under the maximum power limit. In addition to this, Zero can now equip body chips to enhance his abilities, including double-jumping and self-recovery, similar to early Mega Man X titles.

Zero cannot rely on finding secret disks to give him enhancements as in Mega Man Zero 3. Instead, players must collect parts dropped randomly from defeated enemies. Recipes for combining these parts can be obtained from NPCs the player rescues or a Cyber Elf after its stages of evolution. However, the majority of the recipes are found through experimentation with combinations of parts.

Another distinguishing feature of this installment is that Neige and Ciel have different faces depending on their emotion. For instance, after Zero "dies", Ciel is sitting near a tree and tells a promise that saddens her and brightens her. Neige also has an angry face, one that Ciel lacks.

Mini-games and modes 
Mega Man Zero 4 has multiple modes. Easy Mode and Normal Mode are available from the start. Easy Mode makes the game easier to play, but prevents changing the weather conditions or acquiring EX Skills.

After completing the game once on Normal Mode, players can access an additional Hard Mode or start a new game over the old one. There is also an Ultimate Mode, which can only be unlocked when certain criteria are met. Like the previous game, there are seven mini-games that can be unlocked once certain criteria are met. They are as follows:

 Lumberjack – Beat the game with an overall S-Rank.
 Lava Surf – Beat the game with a complete database.
 Busy Basket – Beat the game once on Hard Mode.
 Slam Harvest – Beat the game in less than one hour.
 Plant Panic – Beat the game without feeding your Cyber Elf any E-Crystals.
 Elf Chase – Beat the game without using any recipes.
 Energy Lab – Surpass the high score on all the other mini-games.

Development 
Capcom Japan's announcement of a sequel to Mega Man Zero 3 was anticipated, following the pattern of development news from the previous two Mega Man Zero games. Capcom updated its official site quietly with information stating that the game would have an April 2005 release in Japan.

Reception 

Mega Man Zero 4 has an average of 77% on Metacritic and GameRankings, making it roughly the 85th best-ranking Game Boy Advance title. Mega Man Zero 4 entered Japanese sales charts at number eight during its release week. According to Media Create sales information, Mega Man Zero 4 was the 177th best-selling video game in Japan in 2005 at approximately 74,354 copies.

Mega Man Zero 4 has been called a "refined version of an outstanding platformer series" with a more streamlined weapon and Cyber Elf system. Critics were quick to state that it hadn't changed much and that it was "more of the same". One reviewer, however, stated that the level designs were "slightly less challenging" than those of previous installations, but more inventive.

The simplified Cyber Elf system received mixed reviews. GameSpot thought the new single Cyber Elf was an improvement, while Jeremy Parish of 1up.com stated that it signalled a return "to the old-fashion Mega Man game structure", which he found "unfortunate since the Zero games' greatest strength was their willingness to break the trite and true Mega Man mold".

Critics were mostly neutral about the weather system, saying that diehard players wouldn't make use of the system. It was seen as a nice idea, but the effects weren't "pronounced enough to make most levels worth playing through twice".

Notes

References 

2005 video games
Dystopian video games
Game Boy Advance games
Mega Man Zero games
Video game sequels
Video games about impact events
Video games developed in Japan
Video games scored by Ippo Yamada
Virtual Console games
Virtual Console games for Wii U